John Wilkinson McConnell (October 18, 1907 – February 19, 1997) is a former American college president. McConnell was the eleventh President of the University of New Hampshire from 1963 to 1971. He was appointed president during a period of discussions of the establishment of a state university system in New Hampshire.

McConnell received his BA from Dickinson College in 1929 and his PhD from Yale University in 1937.

McConnell died on Feb. 19, 1997, at his home in Trumansburg, N.Y., He was 89 years old.

References

External links 
University of New Hampshire: Office of the President
Full list of University Presidents (including interim Presidents), University of New Hampshire Library

1907 births
1997 deaths
Presidents of the University of New Hampshire
Yale University alumni
20th-century American academics